Methyl 2-fluoroacrylate (MFA) is a chemical compound classified as an acrylate ester. The molecular formula is C4H5FO2 and the molecular weight is 104.08. The systematic name of this chemical is methyl 2-fluoroprop-2-enoate.

Hazards

MFA is highly flammable and can be harmful if inhaled, in contact with skin, or if swallowed. It is irritating to eyes, respiratory system, and skin.

References

Methyl esters
Monomers
Organofluorides
Acrylate esters